Köşkönü is a village in the Yüksekova District of Hakkâri Province in Turkey. The village is populated by Kurds of the Doski tribe and had a population of 340 in 2022.

The hamlets of Ağıllar, Kurucak, Ortakçı, Sarıtaş and Taşyazı are attached to Köşkönü.

Population 
Population history from 2000 to 2022:

References 

Villages in Yüksekova District
Kurdish settlements in Hakkâri Province